Oh, the Red Viburnum in the Meadow is a Ukrainian patriotic march first published in 1875 by Volodymyr Antonovych and Mykhailo Drahomanov. Written in a modern treatment by the composer Stepan Charnetsky in 1914, in honor and memory of the Sich Riflemen of the First World War, it was later adopted by the Ukrainian People's Army of the Ukrainian War of Independence. This song is known to have many versions and covers.

The  red viburnum of the song ( in Ukrainian)—a deciduous shrub that grows four to five metres tall—is referenced throughout Ukrainian folklore. The red viburnum has a special national appeal and silhouette of it depicted along the edges of the flag of the President of Ukraine.

Following the 2014 annexation by Russia of the Ukrainian Crimean peninsula, and then the 2022 Russian invasion of Ukraine, singing "nationalist anthems" such as Chervona Kalyna in Crimea became punishable by fines and imprisonment.

History 

Due to the song's association with the Ukrainian people's aspiration for independence, singing of the song was banned during the period in which Ukraine was a Soviet Republic (1919-1991). Nevertheless, it was sung by Ukrainian patriots, with defiance; anyone caught singing it was jailed, beaten, and even exiled.

2022 Russian invasion of Ukraine 

In March 2022 the song gained international attention when an Instagram video (link) of an a cappella rendition by Andriy Khlyvnyuk of the Ukrainian band BoomBox singing the first verse of the song was remixed by different artists around the world. The melody was somewhat changed, literally in the first line of the chorus the last syllable is sung ascending sixth. According to Valentyna Kuzyk, in this variant the energy of the primordial breath breaks out of stable forms and enters a new life space. 

BoomBox was touring in the United States when the Russian invasion of Ukraine started on 24 February. In response to the invasion, Khlyvnyuk cut the tour short to return to Ukraine in order to join the armed forces. He recorded the video while wearing army fatigues, standing near Sophia Square in Kyiv, Ukraine, and uploaded it to his Instagram account on 27 February, where it became viral.

The first artist to remix Khlyvnyuk's rendition was South African musician The Kiffness in early March. At the end of the same month, Ukrainian ice dancers Oleksandra Nazarova and Maksym Nikitin performed to the song at the 2022 World Figure Skating Championships in protest of the invasion. 

In April 2022, Pink Floyd made use of Khlyvnyuk's recording for the vocal track of "Hey, Hey, Rise Up!", a single and a video which the band released in aid of Ukrainian humanitarian relief. In the video, Khlyvnyuk's performance is projected behind the band while they are performing and is partly shown full screen. The song opens with a sample from another recording of "Oh, the Red Viburnum...", by the Veryovka Ukrainian Folk Choir.

Since then, new versions have appeared on YouTube, even remixes of the original remix. including a blues version in English Red Kalyna Blues.

Banned in Crimea
Following the 2014 annexation by Russia of the Ukrainian Crimean peninsula, and then the 2022 Russian invasion of Ukraine, singing "nationalist anthems" such as Chervona Kalyna in Crimea was deemed to discredit the Russian army, and was punished by fines and imprisonment. In September 2022, Russian occupation authorities in Crimea jailed and fined members  of a wedding party for "discrediting" the Russian Armed Forces by playing the song. The singers of the song in an online video were imprisoned and fined.

Sergey Aksyonov, the Russian head of the Crimean peninsula, warned that authorities would punish people harshly for singing such songs. He said that "People who do this are acting like traitors", and that there was a special FSB security service group working on the matter.

Charts

Weekly charts

Monthly charts

Year-end charts

Lyrics

References 

Ukrainian patriotic songs
17th-century songs
1914 songs
1914 in Ukraine
Songs about the 2022 Russian invasion of Ukraine